Fauchald is a Norwegian surname. Notable people with the surname include:

Peder Jensen Fauchald (1791–1856), Norwegian politician
Petter Fauchald (1930–2013), Norwegian footballer

Norwegian-language surnames